Armi Olbes Millare is a Filipino singer best known as the lead vocalist/keyboardist of the award-winning Filipino alternative rock band Up Dharma Down. On December 26, 2021, Armi left the band to continue as a soloist.

Life
Since 2006, her band released four albums and toured extensively around the world (including Asia, the Middle East, US and Canada). The BBC tagged them as the "Asian band to most likely to cross over North American shores" while Time has called the band's music "genre-defying" as well as "both thoughtful and sensual." Her band has garnered critical praise from artists such as Tim Bowness of No-Man, Curt Smith of Tears for Fears, and a collaborative track with Scotland's Paul Buchanan of The Blue Nile.

Last year, she launched Startup Series where she plays her unreleased tracks, as well as the beloved hits she has created with UDD in new cities, and kicked it off in Berlin and in the UK.

Stoa Sound, the music-producing body of Stoa Studios was founded by Millare writing original music for film, animation and other media, preserving the same vision and attention to detail as the multi-disciplinary brand.

Millare has done work as Munro— an exploratory artistic platform featuring a multi-sensory and experimental one-off performance for art festivals and artist residencies. Here she gets to work with multi-media artists utilizing her knowledge in Asian Music as her chosen major in the University of the Philippines College of Music.

Her band UDD released their self-titled fourth album last July 2019.

On December 26, 2021, UDD announced that Armi would be parting ways with the band and focusing on being a solo artist.

Discography
With Up Dharma Down
Fragmented (2006, Terno Recordings)
Bipolar (2008, Terno Recordings)
Capacities (2012, Terno Recordings)
U D D (2019, Terno Recordings)

Solo
 "Waiting for a Sign"
 "Eyeliner"
 "Delubyo"
 "Pipikit Ako"
 "An Attempt to Measure Happiness" (Instrumental)
 "Yolanda"
 "Kapit"
 "Two Worlds"
 "Into the Clear"
 "Wrong"

Cover songs
 "Mad World" (Tears for Fears)
 "Tao" from Honor Thy Father Soundtrack – Originally sung by Sampaguita (singer))
"You" – Originally sung by Basil Valdez

Collaboration with D' Sound

Millare collaborated with Norwegian/Pop Band D'Sound for "Lykkelig" (Norwegian word for "happy") and Somewhere in Between. On October 19, 2018, the music video of Lykkelig was released. The third collaboration she did with D'Sound "Run for Cover" was released on November 19, 2021. Official music video was released the same day as single release and the video was shot in Manila, and in Oslo during COVID-19.  
 "Lykkelig"
 "Somewhere in Between"
 "Run for Cover"

Art exhibit
Millare has also explored in the field of visual arts and was frequently seen with artist Kawayan De Guia in 2011 in Baguio City. She has joined in a visual art exhibit entitled ' In Transit' at CCP. She participated in the group exhibit that ran on September 20, 2015 at the Small Gallery of the Cultural Center of the Philippines.
Her work was featured together with musician artists like The Edralins, Kabunyan de Guia, Jazel Kristin, Kanna Magosaki and Geloy Concepcion among others.

Awards and nominations

References 

Living people
Filipino women
1984 births
Place of birth missing (living people)
21st-century Filipino singers
21st-century Filipino women singers